"Best Friend" is a song by American rapper Yelawolf featuring fellow American rapper Eminem. It was released on April 14, 2015 as the fifth single from the former's second studio album Love Story (2015) via Shady and Interscope Records, and was later released on Eminem's second greatest hits album Curtain Call 2 (2022), with Shady, Interscope, Marshall B. Mathers III, and Aftermath Entertainment.

Track listing

Notes
 signifies a co-producer.

Music video
On April 24, 2015, Yelawolf uploaded the music video for "Best Friend" on his YouTube and Vevo account.

Charts

Weekly charts

Certifications

References

2015 songs
2015 singles
Yelawolf songs
Eminem songs
Shady Records singles
Songs written by Yelawolf
Songs written by Eminem
Songs written by Luis Resto (musician)
Song recordings produced by Eminem
Alternative hip hop songs
Interscope Records singles